Longitarsus is a genus of beetles in the family Chrysomelidae. It is the most speciose genus of flea beetles, comprising over 700 species, and has a cosmopolitan distribution.

See also
 List of Longitarsus species

References

 
Taxa named by Pierre André Latreille
Chrysomelidae genera
Insect pests of millets